Efstathios Alexopoulos (born 1946) is a Greek boxer. He competed in the men's light heavyweight event at the 1968 Summer Olympics. At the 1968 Summer Olympics, he lost to Bernard Malherbe of France.

References

1946 births
Living people
Greek male boxers
Olympic boxers of Greece
Boxers at the 1968 Summer Olympics
Sportspeople from Athens
Mediterranean Games silver medalists for Greece
Mediterranean Games medalists in boxing
Competitors at the 1967 Mediterranean Games
Light-heavyweight boxers
20th-century Greek people